is one of Japan's best-known and largest theatre companies.  Shiki Theatre Company employs over 800 actors and staff, and stages about 2800 performances a year.  Shiki Theatre Company operates nine theaters for their exclusive use.  Originally, they staged Shingeki plays.  However, in the late 1970s, they branched out into other forms of theatre found success by staging western and Japanese musicals.

Shiki is also known for producing original language musicals. One such example is the Showa trilogy, a set of three musicals about World War II and the aftermath. The series consists of Ri Kōran, a musical about the famous Manchurian-Japanese singer;  which tells the story of Japanese prisoners of war at an internment camp in Siberia; and  about the trials of innocent B and C-class war criminals in Indonesia.

History
The Shiki Theatre Company was established in 1953 by Keita Asari (浅利慶太) and his company. The organization was established as a stock holding company in 1967.

Theatres

The Shiki Theatre Company owns and operates several theatres across Japan.

Tokyo
Shiki Theatre JIYU – an approximately 500-seat theatre.
Dentsu Shiki Theatre UMI – an approx. 1,200-seat theatre; opened in December 2002.
Shiki Theatre NATSU – opened in July 2010.
The CATS Theatre – an approx. 1,200-seat theatre purpose-built for the Shiki production of Cats.

Sapporo
The Hokkaido Shiki Theatre – opened in January 2011.

Nagoya
The Nagoya Shiki Theatre – an approx. 1,200-seat theatre; opened in October 2016.

Osaka
The Osaka Shiki Theatre – an approx. 1,200-seat theatre; opened in January 2005.

Productions
Past and present productions by the Shiki Theatre Company include the following:

Original shows and adaptations
, based on a novel by Jirō Akagawa
, based on the novel by Miura Tetsuo.
A Robot in the Garden(ロボット・イン・ザ・ガーデン),based on a novel by Deborah Install

Showa trilogy
Ri Koran
Foreign Hill
Southern Cross

Children's theatre
Anne of Green Gables
Maeterlinck's The Blue Bird (Sometimes re-titled: Dreaming)
Lloyd Alexander's The Cat Who Wished to Be a Man
The Emperor's New Clothes
The Story of a Seagull and the Cat Who Taught Her to Fly(based on the book by Luis Sepúlveda)

Western shows
Disney's Aida
A Chorus Line
An American in Paris
Contact
Crazy for You
Equus
Evita
Jesus Christ Superstar
Mamma Mia!
Andrew Lloyd-Webber's Phantom of the Opera
Le Passe Muraille
Spring Awakening
West Side Story
Wicked (2007–2016)

Family entertainment
Disney's Aladdin (2015–present)
Disney's Beauty and the Beast (1995–2017)
Cats (1983–present)
Disney's The Hunchback of Notre Dame (2016–present)
Disney's The Lion King (1998–present)
Disney's The Little Mermaid (2013–present)
Disney's Frozen  (2022–present)

References

External links

 Shiki Theatre Company official website

Theatre companies in Japan